Due diligence is the investigation or exercise of care that a reasonable business or person is normally expected to take before entering into an agreement or contract with another party or an act with a certain standard of care.

It can be a legal obligation, but the term will more commonly apply to voluntary investigations. A common example of due diligence in various industries is the process through which a potential acquirer evaluates a target company or its assets for an acquisition. The theory behind due diligence holds that performing this type of investigation contributes significantly to informed decision making by enhancing the amount and quality of information available to decision makers and by ensuring that this information is systematically used to deliberate on the decision at hand and all its costs, benefits, and risks.

Etymology 
The term “due diligence” means "required carefulness" or "reasonable care" in general usage, and has been used in the literal sense of "requisite effort" since at least the mid-fifteenth century. It became a specialized legal term and later a common business term due to the United States’ Securities Act of 1933, where the process is called "reasonable investigation" (section 11b3). This Act included a defense at Section 11, referred to later in legal usage as the “due diligence” defense, which could be used by broker-dealers when accused of inadequate disclosure to investors of material information with respect to the purchase of securities. In legal and business use, the term was soon used for the process itself instead of how it was to be performed, so that the original expressions such as "exercise due diligence in investigating" and "investigation carried out with due diligence" were soon shortened to "due diligence investigation" and finally "due diligence".

As long as broker-dealers exercised “due diligence” (required carefulness) in their investigation into the company whose equity they were selling, and as long as they disclosed to the investor what they found, they would not be found liable for non-disclosure of information that was not discovered in the process of that investigation.

The broker-dealer community quickly institutionalized, as a standard practice, the conducting of due diligence investigations of any stock offerings in which they involved themselves. Originally the term was limited to public offerings of equity investments, but over time it has become associated with investigations of private mergers and acquisitions as well.

Examples

Business transactions and corporate finance 
Due diligence takes different forms depending on its purpose:
 The examination of a potential target for merger, acquisition, privatization, or similar corporate finance transaction normally by a buyer. (This can include self due diligence or “reverse due diligence”, i.e. an assessment of a company, usually by a third party on behalf of the company, prior to taking the company to market.)
 A reasonable investigation focusing on material future matters.
 An examination being achieved by asking certain key questions, including, how do we buy, how do we structure an acquisition, and how much do we pay?
 An investigation of current practices of process and policies.
 An examination aiming to make an acquisition decision via the principles of valuation and shareholder value analysis.

The due diligence process (framework) can be divided into nine distinct areas:

 Compatibility audit.
 Financial audit.
 Macro-environment audit.
 Legal/environmental audit.
 Marketing audit.
 Production audit.
 Management audit.
 Information systems audit.
 Reconciliation audit.
 

It is essential that the concepts of valuations (shareholder value analysis) be considered in a due diligence process. This is in order to reduce the number of failed mergers and acquisitions.

In this regard, two new audit areas have been incorporated into the Due Diligence framework:
 the Compatibility Audit which deals with the strategic components of the transaction and in particular the need to add shareholder value and
 the Reconciliation audit, which links/consolidates other audit areas together via a formal valuation in order to test whether shareholder value will be added.

The relevant areas of concern may include the financial, legal, labor, tax, IT, environment and market/commercial situation of the company. Other areas include intellectual property, real and personal property, insurance and liability coverage, debt instrument review, employee benefits (including the Affordable Care Act) and labor matters, immigration, and international transactions. Areas of focus in due diligence continue to develop with cybersecurity emerging as an area of concern for business acquirers. Risk is a key factor in determining 'duty of care'; Regulations require 'reasonable security' in cybersecurity programs, and litigators examine whether 'due care' was practiced.  Due diligence findings impact a number of aspects of the transaction including the purchase price, the representations and warranties negotiated in the transaction agreement, and the indemnification provided by the sellers.

Due Diligence has emerged as a separate profession for accounting and auditing experts and is typically referred to as Transaction Services.

Foreign Corrupt Practices Act 

With the number and size of penalties increasing, the United States' Foreign Corrupt Practices Act (FCPA) has caused many U.S. institutions to look into how they evaluate all of their relationships overseas. The lack of a due diligence of a company's agents, vendors, and suppliers, as well as merger and acquisition partners in foreign countries could lead to doing business with an organization linked to a foreign official or state owned enterprises and their executives. This link could be perceived as leading to the bribing of the foreign officials and as a result lead to noncompliance with the FCPA. Due diligence in regard to FCPA compliance is required in two aspects:

 Initial due diligence – this step is necessary in evaluating what risk is involved in doing business with an entity prior to establishing a relationship and assesses risk at that point in time.
 Ongoing due diligence – this is the process of periodically evaluating each relationship overseas to find links between current business relationships overseas and ties to a foreign official or illicit activities linked to corruption. This process will be performed indefinitely as long as a relationship exists, and usually involves comparing the companies and executives to a database of foreign officials. This process should be performed on all relationships regardless of location and is often part of a wider Integrity Management initiative . 

In the M&A context, buyers can use the due diligence phase to integrate a target into their internal FCPA controls, focusing initial efforts on necessary revisions to the target's business activities with a high-risk of corruption.

While financial institutions are among the most aggressive in defining FCPA best practices, manufacturing, retailing and energy industries are highly active in managing FCPA compliance programs.

Human rights
Passed on May 25, 2011, the OECD member countries agreed to revise their guidelines promoting tougher standards of corporate behavior, including human rights. As part of this new definition, they utilized a new aspect of due diligence that requires a corporation to investigate third party partners for potential abuse of human rights.

The OECD Guidelines for Multinational Enterprises (a government-backed international agreement that provides guidance on responsible business conduct) state that multinational enterprises will “Seek ways to prevent or mitigate adverse human rights impacts that are directly linked to their business operations, products or services by a business relationship, even if they do not contribute to those impacts”.

The term ‘due diligence’ was originally put forward in this context by UN Special Representative for Human Rights and Business John Ruggie, who used it as an umbrella to cover the steps and processes by which a company understands, monitors and mitigates its human rights impacts. Human Rights Impact Assessment is a component of this.

The UN formalized guidelines for Human Rights Due Diligence on June 16, 2011, with the endorsement of Ruggie's Guiding Principles for Business and Human Rights.

Civil litigation 
Due diligence in civil procedure is the idea that reasonable investigation is necessary before certain kinds of relief are requested.

For example, duly diligent efforts to locate and/or serve a party with civil process is frequently a requirement for a party seeking to use means other than personal service to obtain jurisdiction over a party. Similarly, in areas of the law such as bankruptcy, an attorney representing someone filing a bankruptcy petition must engage in due diligence to determine that the representations made in the bankruptcy petition are factually accurate. Due diligence is also generally prerequisite to a request for relief in states where civil litigants are permitted to conduct pre-litigation discovery of facts necessary to determine whether or not a party has a factual basis for a cause of action.

In civil actions seeking a foreclosure or seizure of property, a party requesting this relief is frequently required to engage in due diligence to determine who may claim an interest in the property by reviewing public records concerning the property and sometimes by a physical inspection of the property that would reveal a possible interest in the property of a tenant or other person.

Due diligence is also a concept found in the civil litigation concept of a statute of limitations. Frequently, a statute of limitations begins to run against a plaintiff when that plaintiff knew or should have known had that plaintiff investigated the matter with due diligence that the plaintiff had a claim against a defendant. In this context, the term “due diligence” determines the scope of a party's constructive knowledge, upon receiving notice of facts sufficient to constitute “inquiry notice” that alerts a would-be plaintiff that further investigation might reveal a cause of action.

Criminal law 
In criminal law, due diligence is the only available defense to a crime that is one of strict liability (i.e., a crime that only requires an actus reus and no mens rea). Once the criminal offence is proven, the defendant must prove on balance that they did everything possible to prevent the act from happening. It is not enough that they took the normal standard of care in their industry – they must show that they took every reasonable precaution.

Due diligence is also used in criminal law to describe the scope of the duty of a prosecutor, to take efforts to turn over potentially exculpatory evidence, to (accused) criminal defendants.

In criminal law, “due diligence” also identifies the standard a prosecuting entity must satisfy in pursuing an action against a defendant, especially with regard to the provision of the Federal and State Constitutional and statutory right to a speedy trial or to have a warrant or detainer served in an action. In cases where a defendant is in any type of custodial situation where their freedom is constrained, it is solely the prosecuting entities duty to ensure the provision of such rights and present the citizen before the court with jurisdiction. This also applies where the respective judicial system and/or prosecuting entity has current address or contact information on the named party and said party has made no attempt to evade notice of the prosecution of the action.

Due diligence defence
In the United Kingdom, "proper use of a due diligence system" may be used as a defence against a charge of breach of regulations e.g. under the Timber and Timber Products (Placing on the Market) Regulations 2013  and the Environmental Protection (Microbeads) (England) Regulations 2017, businesses may be able to defend a charge of non-compliance with regulations if they can show that they have undertaken supplier due diligence to a necessary standard.

See also
  
 Bias ratio (finance)
 Data room, Virtual data room
 Duty of care
 Hydropower Sustainability Assessment Protocol
 Integrity management
 Management due diligence
 Model audit
 Non-disclosure agreement
 Operational due diligence (ODD)
 Standard of care
 Vetting

References

Corporate finance
American legal terminology
Criminal law
Contract law
Business terms
Mergers and acquisitions